Room & Board is an American modern furniture and home furnishings retailer based in Minneapolis, Minnesota.

John Gabbert founded Room & Board as a subsidiary of his parents' furniture store company (Gabberts), of which he served as president. Room & Board soon spun off to become an independent company with Gabbert at the helm. It presently has 964 employees and operates 22 stores in eleven states plus thirteen delivery/distribution centers around the country,.

The company partners with local companies across the country to produce its modern living, dining, bedroom, kids, office and outdoor furniture and home decor. In 2018, Room & Board introduced a bath collection, including bath vanities, mirrors, lighting and bath decor. Room & Board's Business Interiors division provides services for commercial spaces, including floor planning services, product suggestions, high-volume discounts, commercial interiors-approved product lists, Business Interiors product warranty,  invoicing and payment terms, Project Coordinator assistance, COM customization and customized delivery options.

Hoover's lists IKEA, Pier 1 Imports, and Euromarket's Crate & Barrel as competitors.

Locations

 San Francisco, California
Los Angeles, California
Costa Mesa, California
Dallas, Texas
 San Diego, California
 Denver, Colorado
 Washington, D.C.
 Atlanta, Georgia
 Chicago, Illinois
 Oak Brook, Illinois
 Skokie, Illinois
 Boston, Massachusetts
 Edina, Minnesota
 Portland, Oregon
 New York, New York
 Seattle, Washington
 An outlet store in Golden Valley, Minnesota
 Austin, Texas

See also
 List of furniture types

Notes

American companies established in 1980
Retail companies established in 1980
Home decor retailers
Companies based in Minnesota
Online retailers of the United States